Badminton at the 1973 Southeast Asian Peninsular Games was held at Singapore Badminton Hall, Singapore City, Singapore. Badminton events was held between 2 and 6 September.

Medal winners

Bronze medal matches

Final results

Medal table

References 

1973
Badminton tournaments in Singapore
1973 Southeast Asian Peninsular Games
1973 in badminton